PikPok is a New Zealand video game developer and publisher based in Wellington. It was founded as a subsidiary brand of the game developer Sidhe. Since 2012, PikPok has been the company's primary brand.

PikPok is a developer and publisher of iOS, Android, and computer games. It is known for Flick Kick Football, Flick Kick Football Legends, and Into the Dead. It has also partnered with Adult Swim to produce a number of games, including Robot Unicorn Attack 2, Giant Boulder of Death, Monsters Ate My Condo and its sequel Super Monsters Ate My Condo. PikPok has also partnered with DreamWorks Animation to deliver Turbo Racing League (later renamed Turbo FAST).

Industry awards
Flick Kick Football Legends was nominated for a DICE Award for Mobile Game of the Year in the 2014 ceremony by the Academy of Interactive Arts & Sciences. Super Monsters Ate My Condo was nominated for a BAFTA award for excellence in the area of Mobile & Handheld games in 2013. Flick Kick Football received an honorable mention at the 2011 Independent Games Festival awards. Bird Strike was a finalist at the 2010 International Mobile Gaming Awards.

Games

Developed

Published

References

External links 

Video game development companies
Software companies of New Zealand
Video game companies of New Zealand